San Damiano d'Asti is a comune (municipality) in the Province of Asti in the Italian region Piedmont, located about  southeast of Turin and about  southwest of Asti.

History
The area of the municipality was once occupied in the Middle Ages by the commune of Axtizio and its suburbs of Gorzano, Lavezzole and Marcelengo. In 1275, after losing the war against Asti, Astixio was destroyed. The Astigiani built in its place a new town, called San Damiano d'Asti.

Climate

Twin towns
San Damiano is twinned with:

 Kriens, Switzerland

References

External links